Harriot may refer to:

Elizabeth (Harriot) Wilson (1762–1786), figure in the folklore of southeastern Pennsylvania, hanged for murdering her children
Harriot (crater), lunar crater on the far side of the Moon
Harriot (planet), an exoplanet also known as 55 Cancri f
Harriot Curtis (1881–1974), American golf champion and an early participant in the sport of skiing
Harriot Eaton Stanton Blatch (1856–1940), American writer and suffragist, daughter of Elizabeth Cady Stanton
Harriot Kezia Hunt (1805–1875), early female physician
Thomas Harriot (1560–1621), English astronomer, mathematician, ethnographer, and translator

See also
Hariot (disambiguation)
Cromer Lifeboat Harriot Dixon ON 770, lifeboat, stationed at Cromer in the county of Norfolk in 1934
Thomas Harriot College of Arts and Sciences, the liberal arts college at East Carolina University